is a Japanese actress.

Career
Tokiwa was nominated for the "Best Actress" award at the Japanese Academy Awards in 2005 for her performance in Akai Tsuki.

She co-starred with Hidetoshi Nishijima in Amir Naderi's 2011 film Cut.

Filmography

Film
 Moonlight Express (1999)
 A Fighter's Blues (2000)
 Sennen no Koi Story of Genji (2001)
 Get Up! (2003)
 Akai Tsuki (2004)
 Hoshi ni Natta Shonen (2005)
 Mamiya kyodai (2006)
 Brave Story (2006)
 Metro ni Notte (2006)
 Awakening (2007)
 20th Century Boys (2008)
 Tsuribaka Nisshi 19 (2008)
 After School (2008)
 Listen to My Heart (2009)
 Dirty Hearts (2011)
 Cut (2011)
 Seven Weeks (2014), Nobuko Shimizu
 Dareka no Mokkin (2016)
 Hanagatami (2017)
 Kodomo Shokudō (2018)
 Labyrinth of Cinema (2020), Yuriko Tachibana
 Perfect Strangers (2021)
 Ware Yowakereba: Yajima Kajiko-den (2022), Yajima Kajiko
 The Lump In My Heart (2023)

Television
 Eve wa Hatsukoi no Yoni (1991)
 Taiheiki (1991)
 Ai wa Doda (1992)
 Junen ai (1992)
 Akuma no Kiss (1993)
 The Wide Show (1994)
 Coming Home (1994)
 Watashi no Unmei (1994–1995)
 Kinjirareta Asobi (1995)
 Tell Me That You Love Me (1995)
 Mada koi wa Hajimaranai (1995)
 Minikui Hhiru no Ko (1996)
 Mahiru no Tsuki (1996)
 Hitori Gurashi (1996)
 Risou no Kekkon (1997)
 Saigo no Koi (1997)
 Meguriai (1998)
 Tabloid (1998)
 Utsukushii Hito (1999)
 Kabachitare (2000)
 Beautiful Life (2000)
 The Long Love Letter (2002)
 Renai Hensachi (2002)
 Ryuten no Ohi: Saigo no Kotei (2003)
 The Hit Parade (2006)
 Gyokuran (2007)
 Bizan (2007)
Life in Additional Time (2008)
 Tenchijin (2009)
 Kamisama no Nyobo (2011)
Mare (2015)
 The Good Wife (Japanese TV series) (2019)
 The Return (2020)
 The Makanai: Cooking for the Maiko House (2023)

Awards
 20th Elan d'or Awards: Newcomer of the Year
 6th Television Academy Awards: Best Actress - Tell Me That You Love Me
 10th Television Academy Awards: Best Actress - Mahiru no Tsuki
 12th Television Academy Awards: Best Actress - Risou no Kekkon
 14th Television Academy Awards: Best Actress - Saigo no Koi
 23rd Television Academy Awards: Best Supporting Actress - Utsukushii Hito
 24th Television Academy Awards: Best Actress - Beautiful Life

References

External links
 
 

1972 births
Living people
Japanese actresses
People from Yokohama
Stardust Promotion artists